Yilan County FC is an association football club from Taiwan. They play at the Intercity Football League in Taiwan, which is semi-professional. Their home stadium is 15,000 capacity Yilan County Stadium.

Football clubs in Taiwan